Sông Lô is a district of Vĩnh Phúc province in northern Vietnam. The district is established in January 2009 and named after Lô River. Tam Sơn township is the district seat.

Sông Lô is subdivided into 1 township (thị trấn) and 16 communes (xã). Communes: Bạch Lưu, Hải Lựu, Đôn Nhân, Quang Yên, Lãng Công, Nhân Đạo, Phương Khoan, Đồng Quế, Nhạo Sơn, Như Thuỵ, Yên Thạch, Tân Lập, Tứ Yên, Đồng Thịnh, Đức Bác, Cao Phong.

As of December 2008, Sông Lô had a population of 93,984. The district covers an area of 150.3 km2.

References
 Vietnam Government Decree No. 09/NĐ-CP enacted on 23 December 2009.

Districts of Vĩnh Phúc province